The City of Brighton was a local government area about  south of Melbourne, the state capital of Victoria, Australia.

History

Brighton was first incorporated as a borough on 18 January 1859. It annexed some land in Elwood and Elsternwick in 1870, and became a town on 18 March 1887. It annexed  from the Shire of Moorabbin on 3 April 1912, and on 12 March 1919, it was proclaimed a city. From 1861 onwards, Thomas Bent was associated with the council, being its mayor on several occasions before becoming Treasurer and Premier of Victoria from 1904 until 1909.

Council meetings were held at the court house until 1886, when a stuccoed building, designed by Wilson and Beswicke, was constructed at the corner of Wilson and Carpenter Streets in Brighton and subsequently remodelled in 1933. A new building, housing the council chambers and offices, was built in Boxshall Street to mark the centenary of the municipality in 1959. The former town hall is now home to the Bayside Arts and Cultural Centre which includes the Bayside Gallery, Brighton Historical Society, Brighton Theatre Company and Brighton Art Society.

On 15 December 1994, the City of Brighton was abolished, and along with the City of Sandringham and parts of the suburbs of Cheltenham, Highett and Beaumaris, was merged into the newly created City of Bayside.

Former Mayors

Wards

The City of Brighton was divided into four wards in May 1945, each electing three councillors:
 Centre Ward
 East Ward
 North Ward
 South Ward

Geography

The council area covered the suburbs of Brighton and Brighton East, and was bounded by Port Phillip to the west; Head Street, St Kilda Street and Glen Huntly Road to the north; Nepean Highway, North Road, Thomas Street and Nepean Highway to the east; and South Road and New Street to the south.

Population

* Estimate in the 1958 Victorian Year Book.

References

External links
 Victorian Places - Brighton

Brighton
1859 establishments in Australia
1994 disestablishments in Australia
City of Bayside